List of U.S. cities by adjusted per capita personal income estimates the per capita personal income (PCPI) of residents of United States' Metropolitan statistical areas (MSA). A MSA is defined as a central city or cities and their surrounding area of influence. The PCPI is adjusted by differences in the cost of living, called "regional price parities" by the Bureau of Economic Analysis. The effect of adjusting the per capita personal income by the cost of living is to narrow the difference in the standard of living between most high-income cities and most low-income cities.

The BEA defines regional price parities as an estimate of "the differences in price levels across states and metropolitan areas for a given year and are expressed as a percentage of the overall national price level." The BEA defines personal income as follows:

Personal income is the income received by, or on behalf of, all persons from all sources: from participation as laborers in production, from owning a home or business, from the ownership of financial assets, and from government and business in the form of transfers. It includes income from domestic sources as well as the rest of world. It does not include realized or unrealized capital gains or losses.

Personal income is estimated before the deduction of personal income taxes and other personal taxes and is reported in current dollars (no adjustment is made for price changes).

Per Capita Personal Income (PCPI) is a more inclusive estimate of the average standard of living of  residents in the U.S. than measures of per capita income.  PCPI "includes wages, benefits, proprietor income, dividends, interest, rent, and transfer payments" such as Social Security, veteran's benefits, farm subsidies, welfare, and food stamps.

The difference in estimates of per capita income and per capita personal income is large. In 2019, the U.S. Census Bureau calculated a per capita income of the United States as 34,103 dollars.  The U.S. Bureau of Economic Analysis calculated the PCPI as 56,490 dollars.

A more valid accounting of the differences in the standard of living of residents in different citizens requires recognition that prices vary from state to state and city to city. In general, a dollar has more purchasing power in the poorer cities than it does in the richer cities. The difference in housing costs from city to city is especially important. The Bureau of Economic Analysis has calculated that the regional price parity in 2019 of the 50 largest MSAs ranges from 88.3 in  Birmingham, Alabama (which has the lowest cost of living of the 50 most populous MSAs) to 126.7 in San Jose, California (the highest cost of living of the 50 most populous MSAs). An income of $0.88 in Birmingham equals an income of $1.27 in San Jose with the U.S as a whole having an average PCPI of $1.00. To put it another way, the purchasing power of a dollar compared to the U.S. average is $1.13 in Birmingham and $0.79 in San Jose. The net impact of accounting for differences in the purchasing power of a dollar in different MSAs is to narrow the gap in the standard of living between rich and poor cities.

The statistical analysis is complicated by the various definitions of what constitutes a "city."  There are three commonly used definitions. First, is the population with the legal limits of an incorporated city. Secondly. is an MSA which includes not only the population within the legal boundaries of a city but also the population of the jurisdictions in its suburbs and in the surrounding counties which are influenced by the central city. influence. Thirdly, adding to the complexity, are Combined Statistical Areas which combine the population of two or more MSAs.

The population and per capita personal income estimates of metropolitan statistical areas are used in the following table.

Standard Metropolitan statistical areas by PCPI, adjusted by regional price parity

References

 
Economy of the United States-related lists
Gross domestic product
Income distribution
 
 
United States demography-related lists